Sempronius Hamilton Boyd (May 28, 1828 – June 22, 1894) was a nineteenth-century politician, lawyer, judge and teacher from Missouri. He served as a member of the United States House of Representatives from Missouri and United States minister to Siam.

Biography
Born in Williamson County, Tennessee near Nashville, Boyd moved to a farm near Springfield, Missouri with his parents in 1840, where he was educated by private tutors. He moved to California in 1849 where he prospected for gold and taught school. He moved back to Missouri in 1854 where he was clerk of the court of Greene County, Missouri from 1854 to 1856, studied law and was admitted to the bar in 1856, commencing practice in Springfield, Missouri.

Boyd served as mayor of Springfield in 1856 and at the outbreak of the Civil War, raised the 24th Missouri Infantry for the Union Army, serving as its colonel from 1861 to 1863. He was elected an Unconditional Unionist to the United States House of Representatives in 1862, serving from 1863 to 1865. There, he served as chairman of the Committee on Revisal and Unfinished Business from 1863 to 1865. Boyd was a member of the Republican National Committee from 1864 to 1868, was a delegate to the Republican National Convention in 1864, and was appointed judge of the court of the fourteenth judicial district in 1865. The same year, he presided over the trial of Wild Bill Hickok over the death of Davis Tutt, during which he famously suggested to the jury the possibility of nullification, which they proceeded to do.

Boyd was involved in building and operating the Southwest Pacific Railroad from 1867 to 1874. He was elected back to the House of Representatives as a Republican in 1868, serving again from 1869 to 1871. There, he served as chairman of the Committee on Revolutionary Claims from 1869 to 1871.

Afterward, Boyd operated a wagon factory from 1874 to 1876, resumed practicing law, and was appointed U.S. Minister and Consul General to Siam by President Benjamin Harrison in 1890, serving until 1892, when he became too ill to continue in the position and returned to the United States.

He died in Springfield, Missouri on June 22, 1894 and was interred in Hazelwood Cemetery in Springfield. Following his death, both Boyd's estate and Boyd's own appointed successor as Consul General to Siam sued to recover the salary of the office for the period between Boyd's departure and the qualification of a presidentially appointed successor. Boyd's estate lost the case, and the Supreme Court of the United States upheld this outcome in the 1898 case of United States v. Eaton.

References

External links
 Retrieved on 2008-02-14

1828 births
1894 deaths
People from Williamson County, Tennessee
Unconditional Union Party members of the United States House of Representatives from Missouri
Missouri Unconditional Unionists
Republican Party members of the United States House of Representatives from Missouri
Ambassadors of the United States to Thailand
Mayors of places in Missouri
Politicians from Springfield, Missouri
History of Greene County, Missouri
Missouri lawyers
Union Army colonels
19th-century American railroad executives
Gold prospectors
American gold prospectors
People of Missouri in the American Civil War
19th-century American politicians
19th-century American lawyers
People from Greene County, Missouri